The Merry Cemetery is a cemetery in the village of Săpânța, Maramureș County, Romania. It is famous for its brightly coloured tombstones with naïve paintings describing, in an original and poetic manner, the people who are buried there in addition to scenes from their lives. The Merry Cemetery became an open-air museum and a national tourist attraction. It has been listed as one of the Seven Wonders of Romania by Imperator Travel.

The unusual feature of this cemetery is that it diverges from the prevalent belief, culturally shared within European societies, that views death as something indelibly solemn. Connections with the local Dacian culture have been made, whose philosophical tenets presumably vouched for the immortality of the soul and the belief that death was a moment filled with joy and anticipation for a better life (see also Zalmoxianism).

A collection of the epitaphs from the Merry Cemetery exists in a 2017 volume called Crucile de la Săpânța, compiled by author Roxana Mihalcea, as well as in a photography book titled The Merry Cemetery of Sapanta by Peter Kayafas.

The founder
The cemetery's origins are linked with the name of Stan Ioan Pătraș, a local artist who sculpted the first tombstone crosses. In 1935, Pătraș carved the first epitaph and, as of the 1960s, more than 800 of such oak wood crosses came into sight. The inscription on his tombstone cross says:

Funny epitaphs

Gallery

See also
Tourism in Romania 
Seven Wonders of Romania

References

External links

 
 Photos of the Merry Cemetery
 The Merry Cemetery of Sapanta on Purple Martin Press
 Brandon's Photos of the Merry Cemetery
 More epitaphs and photos (in Romanian)

Cemeteries in Romania
Eastern Orthodox cemeteries
Historic monuments in Maramureș County